New Taipei City Stadium could mean:
 Banqiao Stadium
 Shulin Stadium
 Xinzhang Stadium